March Academy is a small secular private school located in Ottawa’s west end (Ottawa, Ontario, Canada). March Academy was established in 2003, and in 2006, the school expanded and updated its facilities. March Academy offers education for students in grades 1 - 8. March Academy offers an alternative education to the public system for these students.  The school colours are blue and gold (yellow gold). This colour scheme is reflected throughout the March Academy crest (logo), clothing and building. (See above)

Additional Programming 

Students at March Academy participate in activities including piano, French, tae-kwon-do, choir, yoga, running, cross country skiing, and more. In the past students have participated in activities such as swimming, hip-hop dance, square dance, drama, pottery, fencing, and downhill skiing.

Events 

March Academy puts on and attends several events annually. These include fundraisers, awareness campaigns, school building, and health and awareness activities. In 2010, March Academy began a campaign to help grandmothers in Africa. Students created cookbooks with recipes from their own grandmothers and sold them to help grandmothers in Africa while partnered with other local organizations. The campaign raised $2,000 and was donated to a branch of the Stephen Lewis Foundation.

Professionalism 

The teachers at March Academy are registered at the Ontario College of Teachers and have over 70 years of cumulative experience. The academy has approximately 5 staff members. The director/owner of March Academy is Michael Kennedy.

Classes 

Class sizes are approximately 1:10 Students do not wear uniforms throughout the entire week, however they do wear March Academy vests and golf T-shirts on Mondays, outings and special occasions.

References

Schools in Ottawa